Carex unisexualis is a tussock-forming species of perennial sedge in the family Cyperaceae. It is native to Japan and south eastern parts of China.

See also
List of Carex species

References

unisexualis
Plants described in 1904
Taxa named by Charles Baron Clarke
Flora of China
Flora of Japan